Dan Shanoff is a former writer for ESPN.com's Page2 section who now runs his own sports blog.  Every weekday morning between January 6, 2003 and August 31, 2006 he put out a "Daily Quickie" article, in which he discussed the important sports happenings from the previous day and those due to be played in the immediate future.  One of Shanoff signature traits in his writing is his love of 'Instant History,' meaning that whatever took place yesterday in sports is generally the most important thing to ever happen.  On January 14, 2008, Shanoff moved his blog to the Sporting News Blog under the moniker of "The Wake-Up Call." On July 20, 2010 the Sporting Blog was discontinued.

Daily Quickie
In addition to the "Daily Quickie" article, Shanoff ran a daily chat from 9am-10am Eastern Time called the Morning Quickie (or MQ).  On August 31, 2006 he posted the final Daily Quickie column and retired the Morning Quickie chat. On September 1, 2006 he started a new blog site on Blogspot, where he continues to provide analysis of sporting events.

References

External links
Daily Quickie
Dan Shanoff's Blog

Year of birth missing (living people)
Living people
American sportswriters
ESPN.com
Medill School of Journalism alumni
Harvard Business School alumni
People from Bethesda, Maryland
Walt Whitman High School (Maryland) alumni